Eaton is a former civil parish, now in the parishes of Eaton and Eccleston and Poulton and Pulford, in Cheshire West and Chester, England. It  contains 56 buildings that are recorded in the National Heritage List for England as designated listed buildings.  Two of these are listed at Grade I, the highest grade, four at the middle grade, Grade II*, and the rest at the lowest grade, Grade II.  The most important structures in the parish are Eaton Hall and its associated buildings. All the listed buildings in the parish are related to the hall or its park.  Many of the buildings were designed by prominent architects chosen by the Grosvenor family, in particular Alfred Waterhouse, John Douglas, and Detmar Blow.

Key

Buildings

See also
Grade II listed buildings in Chester (south)
Listed buildings in Aldford
Listed buildings in Eccleston
Listed buildings in Huntington
Listed buildings in Marlston-cum-Lache
Listed buildings in Poulton
Listed buildings in Pulford
Listed buildings in Saighton

References
Citations

Sources

Listed buildings in Cheshire West and Chester
Lists of listed buildings in Cheshire